Sell, Sell, Sell is the third studio album by British musician David Gray, released in April 1996 by EMI. Two promotional-only singles were released: "Faster Sooner Now" and "Late Night Radio".

Track listing

Credits

Musicians 
 David Gray – vocals, guitars, keyboards and harmonica
 Craig McClune – drums, backing vocals and bass on "Hold on To Nothing"
 David Nolte – bass, lead guitars, piano, organ, etc., etc.
 Kristi Callan – backing vocals on "What Am I Doing Wrong?"

Production 
 Recorded by Bryan Zee and Paul Kimble; except tracks 3, 10, and 11 recorded by Bob Salcedo and David Nolte, and track 12 recorded by Matt White.
 Mixed by Bob Salcedo and David Nolte.
 Mastered by Gavin Lurssen.
 Sleeve design by Mark Farrow Design.
 B&W photography by Rankin'. Colour photography by Sean Ash.

External links

David Gray (musician) albums
1996 albums
EMI Records albums